Slovák, meaning "Slovak" in the Slovak language, is a surname. Notable persons with that surname include:
 Jozef Slovák (born 1951), Slovak serial killer
 Ladislav Slovák (1909–1999), Slovak conductor
 Samuel Slovák (born 1975), Slovak footballer
 Tomáš Slovák (born 1983), Slovak ice hockey player

Slovak-language surnames